The Men's Madison event at the 2010 South American Games was held on March 21.

Medalists

Results

Distance: 140 laps (35 km) with 7 sprint
Elapsed time: 43:20.170
Average Speed: 48.458 km/h

References
Report

Madison M
Men's madison